The following outline is provided as an overview of and topical guide to Saint Pierre and Miquelon:

The collectivity comprises a group of small islands, the main ones being Saint Pierre and Miquelon.

The islands are part of France and the European Union but due to special immigration procedures, EU nationals who are not French citizens are not allowed to exercise free movement and business establishment in the archipelago.

The archipelago is the only remnant of the former colonial territory of New France that remains under French control.

General reference 
 Pronunciation: ; 
 Common English country name:  Saint Pierre and Miquelon
 Official English country name:  The French Territorial Collectivity of Saint Pierre and Miquelon
 Common endonym: Saint-Pierre et Miquelon
 Official endonym: Collectivité territoriale de Saint-Pierre-et-Miquelon
 Adjectival(s): Saint-Pierrais, Miquelonnais
 Demonym(s): Saint-Pierrais, Pierrois (older usage, particularly for residents of Saint Pierre Island), Miquelonais, French, Frenchman, Frenchwoman
 Etymology: Name of Saint Pierre and Miquelon
 ISO country codes:  PM, SPM, 666
 ISO region codes:  See ISO 3166-2:PM
 Internet country code top-level domain:  .pm

Geography of Saint Pierre and Miquelon 

Geography of Saint Pierre and Miquelon

 Saint Pierre and Miquelon is: an overseas collectivity of France
 Location: 
 Northern Hemisphere and Western Hemisphere
 North America (though not on the mainland)
 Atlantic Ocean
 North Atlantic (south of Newfoundland, Canada)
 Time zone:  UTC-03, summer UTC-02
 Extreme points of Saint Pierre and Miquelon
 High:  Morne de la Grande Montagne on Miquelon 
 Low:  North Atlantic Ocean 
 Land boundaries:  none
 Coastline:  North Atlantic Ocean 
 Population of Saint Pierre and Miquelon: 7,063 (2009 estimate)
 Area of Saint Pierre and Miquelon: 
 Atlas of Saint Pierre and Miquelon

Environment of Saint Pierre and Miquelon 

 Climate of Saint Pierre and Miquelon
 Renewable energy in Saint Pierre and Miquelon
 Geology of Saint Pierre and Miquelon
 Protected areas of Saint Pierre and Miquelon
 Biosphere reserves in Saint Pierre and Miquelon
 National parks of Saint Pierre and Miquelon
 Wildlife of Saint Pierre and Miquelon
 Fauna of Saint Pierre and Miquelon
 Birds of Saint Pierre and Miquelon
 Mammals of Saint Pierre and Miquelon

Natural geographic features of Saint Pierre and Miquelon 

 Islands of Saint Pierre and Miquelon
 Rivers of Saint Pierre and Miquelon
 World Heritage Sites in Saint Pierre and Miquelon: None

Regions of Saint Pierre and Miquelon 

 List of cities in Saint-Pierre and Miquelon

Demography of Saint Pierre and Miquelon 

Demographics of Saint Pierre and Miquelon

Neighbours of Saint Pierre and Miquelon 
Saint Pierre and Miquelon shares a maritime border with:

Government and politics of Saint Pierre and Miquelon 

Politics of Saint Pierre and Miquelon
 Form of government:
 Capital of Saint Pierre and Miquelon: Saint-Pierre
 Elections in Saint Pierre and Miquelon
 Legislative elections: 2000 - 2006
 Political parties in Saint Pierre and Miquelon

Branches of the government of Saint Pierre and Miquelon 

Government of Saint Pierre and Miquelon

Executive branch of the government of Saint Pierre and Miquelon 
 Head of state: President of France
 Head of government: Prefect of Saint Pierre and Miquelon
 Cabinet of Saint Pierre and Miquelon

Legislative branch of the government of Saint Pierre and Miquelon 
 National:
 Saint-Pierre-et-Miquelon's 1st constituency
 1 deputy in the National Assembly of France
 1 senator in the Senate of France
 Territorial:
 Territorial Council of Saint Pierre and Miquelon

Judicial branch of the government of Saint Pierre and Miquelon

Foreign relations of Saint Pierre and Miquelon

International organization membership 
The Territorial Collectivity of Saint Pierre and Miquelon is a member of:
Universal Postal Union (UPU)
World Federation of Trade Unions (WFTU)

Law and order in Saint Pierre and Miquelon 

LGBT rights in Saint Pierre and Miquelon
 Law enforcement in Saint Pierre and Miquelon

Military of Saint Pierre and Miquelon

Local government in Saint Pierre and Miquelon 

Municipal governments in Saint Pierre and Miquelon

History of Saint Pierre and Miquelon

Culture of Saint Pierre and Miquelon 

Culture of Saint Pierre and Miquelon

 Languages of Saint Pierre and Miquelon
 National symbols of Saint Pierre and Miquelon
Coat of arms of Saint Pierre and Miquelon
Flag of Saint Pierre and Miquelon
National anthem of Saint Pierre and Miquelon
 Public holidays in Saint Pierre and Miquelon
Roman Catholic Vicariate Apostolic of Iles Saint Pierre and Miquelon
 World Heritage Sites in Saint Pierre and Miquelon: None

Art in Saint Pierre and Miquelon 
 Art in Saint Pierre and Miquelon
 Cinema of Saint Pierre and Miquelon
 The Widow of Saint-Pierre
 Literature of Saint Pierre and Miquelon
 Music of Saint Pierre and Miquelon
 Television in Saint Pierre and Miquelon
 Theatre in Saint Pierre and Miquelon

Sport in Saint Pierre and Miquelon 

Sport in Saint Pierre and Miquelon
 Football in Saint Pierre and Miquelon
 Saint Pierre and Miquelon national football team
 Saint Pierre and Miquelon at the Olympics

Economy and infrastructure of Saint Pierre and Miquelon 

Economy of Saint Pierre and Miquelon
 Economic rank, by nominal GDP (2007):
 Communications in Saint Pierre and Miquelon
 Internet in Saint Pierre and Miquelon

Currency of Saint Pierre and Miquelon: Euro (see also: Euro topics)
ISO 4217: EUR
 Transport in Saint Pierre and Miquelon
 Airports in Saint Pierre and Miquelon

Education in Saint Pierre and Miquelon 

Education in Saint Pierre and Miquelon

See also 

Saint Pierre and Miquelon
Index of Saint Pierre and Miquelon-related articles
List of international rankings
Outline of France
Outline of geography
Outline of North America

References

External links 

 Community, culture and history
 Municipal Government of St-Pierre 
 History of Saint-Pierre and Miquelon
 St Pierre & Miquelon Online Community
 The liberation of  St Pierre & Miquelon December 24th 1941 by the Free French Naval Forces 
 CIA World Factbook entry for Saint-Pierre and Miquelon
 History of French submarine telegraph cables
 Miquelon and St. Pierre history site produced by Newfoundland's Memorial University

 Tourism
 Tourist Office Official web site st-pierre-et-miquelon.info
 Tourism and Travel Resources for St Pierre & Miquelon
 Frequently Asked Questions Tourism and Travel
 Maps of Towns in Saint-Pierre & Miquelon
 

 Territorial issues
 Saint-Pierre & Miquelon Continental Plate - "Defend Saint-Pierre & Miquelon"

Saint Pierre and Miquelon
 1